This is a list of player transfers involving Top14 teams between the end of the 2013–14 season and up to the 2014–15 season.

Bayonne

Players In
  Blair Stewart from  Grenoble
  Giogi Jgenti from  Perpignan
  Lukas Pointud from  Tarbes
  Pelu Taele from  Biarritz
  Thibault Visensang from  Albi
  Benjamin Macome from  Stade Français
  Lalakai Foketi from  Melbourne Rebels

Players Out
  Guillaume Bernad to  Oyonnax
  Julien Puricelli to  Lyon
  Neemia Tialata to  Toulouse
  Stephen Brett to  Lyon
  Mathieu Bélie to  Perpignan
  Victor Manukula to  Béziers
  Pierre-Philippe Lafond to  Montauban
  Abdellatif Boutaty to  Pau
  Sam Gerber retired
  Manu Ahotaeiloa

Bordeaux

Players In
  Lionel Beauxis from  Toulouse
  Francisco Gomez Kodela from  Biarritz
  Julien Le Devedec from  Brive
  Yann Lesgourgues from  Biarritz
  Sébastien Taofifenua from  Perpignan
  Bertrand Guiry from  Perpignan
  Sofiane Guitoune from  Perpignan
  Berend Botha from  Mont-de-Marsan
  Paulin Riva from  Auch

Players Out
  Jean-Charles Fidinde to  Narbonne
  Silviu Florea retired
  Gauthier Gibouin to  Montauban
  Nicolás Sánchez
  Cameron Treloar
  Aliki Fakaté retired
  Poutasi Luafutu to  Brive
  Emmanuel Saubusse to  Mont-de-Marsan
  Gilen Queheille to  Tarbes
  Jean-Baptiste Lamotte to  Tarbes
  Rafael Carballo
  Joaquin Tuculet
  Bruce Reihana retired

Brive

Players In
  Damien Jourdain from  Bourg-en-Bresse
  Thomas Acquier from  Carcassonne
  Russlan Boukerou from  Auch
  Peet Marais from  
  Poutasi Luafutu from  Bordeaux Bègles
  Nicolas Bézy from  Grenoble
  Benito Masilevu from  Fiji VII

Players Out
  Tamato Leupolu
  Victor Laval
  Julien Le Devedec to  Bordeaux Bègles
  Apisai Naikatini
  Laurent Ferrères retired

Castres

Players In
  Johnnie Beattie from  Montpellier
  Julien Dumora from  Lyon
  Paea Fa'anunu from  Montpellier
  Yohan Montes from  Toulouse
  Sitiveni Sivivatu from  Clermont Auvergne
  Thomas Combezou from  Montpellier

Players Out
  Paul Bonnefond to  Lyon
  Antonie Claassen to  Racing Métro
  Michael Coetzee
  Brice Dulin to  Racing Métro
  Anton Peikrishvili to  Racing Métro
  Julien Tomas to  Stade Francais
  Seremaia Bai to  Leicester Tigers
  Pedrie Wannenburg to  Oyonnax
  Romain Teulet retired
  Pierre-Gilles Lakafia to  France VII

Clermont

Players In
  Sébastien Vahaamahina from  Perpignan
  Jonathan Davies from  Scarlets
  John Ulugia from  Bourg-en-Bresse
  Zac Guildford from  Crusaders
  Nick Abendanon from  Bath Rugby
  Pedro Bettencourt from  Lusitanos XV
  Viktor Koleilishvili from  Lyon
  Camille Lopez from  Perpignan

Players Out
  Regan King to  Scarlets
  Lee Byrne to  Newport Gwent Dragons
  Sitiveni Sivivatu to  Castres Olympique
  Benoit Cabello to  Perpignan
  Nathan Hines to  Sale Sharks
  Gerhard Vosloo to  Toulon
  Elvis Vermeulen retired

Grenoble

Players In
  Gio Aplon from  Stormers
  Julien Brugnaut from  Racing Métro
  Chris Farrell from  Ulster
  Rory Grice from  Waikato
  Charl McLeod from  
  Ross Skeate from  Agen
  Jackson Willison from  Blues
  Jonathan Wisniewski from  Racing Métro
  Paul Willemse from  Blue Bulls
  Jono Owen from  Queensland Reds

Players Out
  Olly Barkley to  London Welsh
  Cédric Béal to  Mont-de-Marsan
  Roland Bernard
  Vincent Campo to  Pau
  Olivier Chaplain
  Rudi Coetzee
  Romain David to  Dax
  Andrew Farley
  Altenstad Hulme
  Kenan Mutapcic
  Florian Ninard
  Flavien Nouhaillaguet
  Shane O'Leary to  Connacht
  Shaun Sowerby
  Blair Stewart to  Bayonne
  Mathieu Lorée to  Lyon

La Rochelle

Players In
 Alofa Alofa from  Waratahs
 Romana Graham from  Exeter Chiefs
 Jean-Marc Doussain from  Toulouse
  Jone Qovu from  Racing Métro

Players Out

Lyon

Players In
 Hoani Tui from  Exeter Chiefs
  Emmanuel Felsina from  Toulon
  Pierrick Gunther from  Toulon
  Julien Puricelli from  Bayonne
  Stephen Brett from  Bayonne
  Paul Bonnefond from  Montpellier
  Karim Ghezal from  Racing Métro
  Fabrice Estebanez from  Racing Métro
  Deon Fourie from  Stormers
  Jerome Porical from  Stade Français
  Mathieu Lorée from  Grenoble
  Vincent Martin from  Toulon
  George Smith from  Suntory Sungoliath
  Masi Matadigo from  Racing Métro

Players Out

Montpellier

Players In
  Antoine Battut from  Racing Métro
  Benjamin Fall from  Racing Métro
  Teddy Iribaren from  Tarbes
  Ben Mowen from  Brumbies
  Akapusi Qera from  Toulouse
  Samisoni Viriviri from  Fiji VII
  Tom Donnelly from  Blues
  Pat Cilliers from  Stormers

Players Out
  Yoan Audrin to  Racing Métro
  Johnnie Beattie to  Castres
  Eric Escande to  Toulon
  Paea Fa'anunu to  Castres
  Mamuka Gorgodze to  Toulon
  Paul Grant to  Nottingham
  Jim Hamilton to  Saracens
  Juan Figallo to  Saracens
  JP du Plessis to

Oyonnax

Players In
 Maurie Fa'asavalu from  Harlequins
 Soane Tonga'uiha from  Racing Metro
 Pedrie Wannenburg from  Castres Olympique
 Riaan Smit from  Cheetahs

Players Out
 Lucas González Amorosino to  Cardiff Blues

Racing Métro

Players In
  Tomás Lavanini from  Hindú
  Yoan Audrin from  Montpellier
  Antonie Claassen from  Castres
  Brice Dulin from  Castres
  Anton Peikrishvili from  Castres
  Teddy Thomas from  Biarritz
  Casey Laulala from  Munster
  Luke Charteris from  Perpignan
  Johan Goosen from  Cheetahs

Players Out
  Antoine Battut to  Montpellier
  Julien Brugnaut to  Grenoble
  Benjamin Fall to  Montpellier
  Karim Ghezal to  Lyon
  Masi Matadigo to  Lyon
  Jone Qovu to  La Rochelle
  Jonathan Wisniewski to  Grenoble
  Fabrice Estebanez to  Lyon

Stade Français

Players In
  Raphaël Lakafia from  Biarritz
  Hugh Pyle from  Melbourne Rebels
  Julien Tomas from  Castres
  Krisnan Inu from  Canterbury Bulldogs (NRL)

Players Out

Toulon

Players In
  Fabien Barcella from  Biarritz
  Nicolas Durand from  Perpignan
  Éric Escande from  Montpellier
  Mamuka Gorgodze from  Montpellier
  Guilhem Guirado from  Perpignan
  Leigh Halfpenny from  Cardiff Blues
  Juan Martín Hernández (free agent) (Short-term deal effective January 2015)
  James O'Connor from  London Irish (Short-term deal)
  Romain Taofifenua from  Perpignan
  Gerhard Vosloo from  Clermont

Players Out

  Emmanuel Felsina to  Lyon
  Pierrick Gunther to  Lyon (on loan)
  Vincent Martin to  Lyon
  Benjamin Noirot to  Biarritz
  James O'Connor to  Queensland Reds (from January 2015)
  Alexis Palisson to  Toulouse
  Danie Rossouw retired
  Andrew Sheridan retired
  Joe van Niekerk retired
  Jonny Wilkinson retired

Toulouse

Players In
 Toby Flood from  Leicester
  Corey Flynn from  Crusaders
  Imanol Harinordoquy from  Biarritz
  Alexis Palisson from  Toulon
  Neemia Tialata from  Bayonne

Players Out
  Jean-Pascal Barraque to  La Rochelle
  Lionel Beauxis to  Bordeaux-Bègles
  Jaba Bregvadze released
  Bastien Chalureau to  Perpignan
  Yves Donguy to  Oyonnax
  Hosea Gear to  Honda Heat
  Antoine Guillamon to  Oyonnax
  Alex Luatua to  Oyonnax
  Pierre Maurens to  Carcassonne
  Yohan Montes to  Castres
  Jean-Bernard Pujol to  Perpignan
  Akapusi Qera to  Montpellier

See also
List of 2014–15 Premiership Rugby transfers
List of 2014–15 Pro12 transfers
List of 2014–15 Super Rugby transfers
List of 2014–15 RFU Championship transfers

References

2014-15
2014–15 Top 14 season